Taxman is a clone of Namco's Pac-Man written by Brian Fitzgerald for the Apple II and published by H.A.L. Labs, a firm he cofounded with Greg Autry, in 1981.

Featuring the same maze and yellow Pac-Man character as the arcade game, and promoted as "the definitive version of the popular game," HAL was asked to stop selling Taxman by Atari, Inc. who owned the home rights to Pac-Man. Atari published a modified version of Taxman as the official Apple II port of Pac-Man under its Atarisoft label. HAL Labs then changed the mazes and some of the graphics of Taxman and rebranded it as Taxman 2 in 1982.

Fitzgerald publicly released the Taxman source code in 2015.

Plot
Taxman is set in the land of Tanstaafl in which the rebellious citizens are rioting in the streets, and the player passes through tax centers located in each precinct to temporarily pacify the rebels.

Reception
Karl Westerholm reviewed Taxman in The Space Gamer No. 56. Westerholm commented that "I definitely recommend this game to all who waste too many quarters at arcades, as it is just as addictive as the original."

References

External links 
 
 Taxman at GameFAQs
 Taxman at MobyGames
Review in Creative Computing
Review in Commodore User

1981 video games
Apple II games
Apple II-only games
Multiplayer and single-player video games
Pac-Man clones
Tax resistance
Video games developed in the United States